Danny Maciocia (born May 26, 1967) is the head coach and general manager of the Montreal Alouettes of the Canadian Football League (CFL). He was previously head coach of the Université de Montréal Carabins football team. He is also the former general manager and director of football operations of the Canadian Football League's Edmonton Eskimos and former offensive coordinator with the André-Grasset Phénix, a CEGEP team in Montreal.

Early life
Maciocia grew up in the Saint-Leonard neighbourhood of suburban Montreal. He played football in high school. He graduated from Laurier Macdonald High School in 1984, and then worked in the family insurance business.

Coaching and Managerial career

Early years 
Maciocia began his professional coaching career in 1993 when he took a job as an assistant coach with the Canadian junior national football team. In 1995, he moved into the ranks of the CJFL as offensive coordinator of the St. Leonard Cougars, who won the championship of the league in Maciocia's first year.

Montreal Alouettes 
In 1998, Maciocia entered the CFL as the running backs coach of the Montreal Alouettes. In 2001, he became offensive coordinator in Montreal, then took the same position in Edmonton the following season. Maciocia was also the head coach of the 2004 edition of the Canadian junior football team for the eighth NFL Global Junior Championship.

Edmonton Eskimos 
Maciocia was announced as the offensive coordinator for the Edmonton Eskimos on February 19, 2002. He served in that role for three years where the Eskimos appeared in two Grey Cup games, including his first championship win in the 91st Grey Cup game. He was appointed as head coach of the Eskimos after the firing of former coach Tom Higgins following 2004 CFL season. Maciocia became the first Quebec-born head coach in CFL history and the first Canadian head coach of the Eskimos since Annis Stukus in 1951. In 2005, Maciocia guided the Eskimos to a championship victory in the 93rd Grey Cup, the thirteenth in franchise history. He was also the first Canadian-born head coach in Eskimos history to win the Grey Cup with the team.

The 2006 season was not successful for Maciocia and the Eskimos. The team missed the play-offs for the first time in 35 years, ending a record streak for consecutive post-season appearances among North American professional sports teams. Rumours abounded of Maciocia being on the hotseat after the 2006 campaign, but during the off-season he was surprisingly given a promotion. In addition to coach, Maciocia became director of football operations. As a result, he had a high degree control over decisions on player personnel. Despite Maciocia taking more control, the Eskimos finished with an even worse record in 2007 and once again missed the play-offs. He resigned as head coach while continuing on as head of football operations following the end of the 2008 CFL season, where the Eskimos managed to make the playoffs with a 10–8 record, defeated the Winnipeg Blue Bombers in the East Semi-Final, and lost the East Final against the Montreal Alouettes. On July 31, 2010, Maciocia was fired by the Eskimos after the first win in a 1-4 start to the 2010 season.

Montreal Carabins 
Maciocia served as a volunteer coach for Collège André-Grasset for the 2010 season helping them to a Quebec junior college (CEGEP) championship. He was later named head coach of the Montreal Carabins football team of the Université de Montréal on November 17, 2010. In the 2014, as the Carabins won the 50th Vanier Cup. On their way there, they defeated the Laval Rouge et Or to win their first Dunsmore Cup, the Manitoba Bisons in the Uteck Bowl and then the McMaster Marauders in the Vanier Cup final. In the 2015, the Carabins once again returned to the national title game with Maciocia at the helm, only to be defeated this time by the UBC T-Birds, 16-13.

Montreal Alouettes 
Maciocia was briefly considered a candidate for the Montreal Alouettes vacant general manager position in December 2016, following the mutual termination of Jim Popp's contract. The job instead went to Kavis Reed. In early January 2020 he was once-again rumoured to be a top-candidate to replace Kavis Reed after the team was sold to Sid Spiegel and Gary Stern. After much speculation, Maciocia was named General Manager of the Montreal Alouettes on January 13, 2020. In his first season as general manager, in 2021, the team finished in third place in the East Division with a 7–7 record and lost the East Semi-Final.

After the first four games of the 2022 season, the team's head coach Khari Jones was fired and replaced by Maciocia.

CFL GM record

CFL coaching record

Personal life 
Maciocia and his wife Sandra Vaz have three daughters. Maciocia is fluent in English, French, and Italian.

References

External links
 Eskimos' Press Release on Maciocia's hiring as head coach

1967 births
Living people
Anglophone Quebec people
Edmonton Elks coaches
Edmonton Elks general managers
Canadian people of Italian descent
Players of Canadian football from Quebec
Canadian football people from Montreal
TCU Horned Frogs football players
Montreal Carabins football coaches
Montreal Alouettes coaches
Montreal Alouettes general managers